Traditionally, name day celebrations have often enjoyed a celebratory emphasis greater than that of birthday celebrations in Poland. However, birthday celebrations are increasingly popular and important, particularly among the young as well as the older generation in the territories regained after the Second World War due to remaining Prussian Protestant influences.

Name day celebrations involve the gathering and socialising of friends and family at the celebrant's home, as well as the giving of gifts and flowers at home and elsewhere, such as at the workplace. This tradition doesn't include regions of Upper Silesia and Kashubia. Local calendars often contain the names celebrated on a given day. If a name is celebrated on more than one day, it is customary to choose the first day after the celebrant's birthday.

January 
 Mieczysław, Mieczysława, Mieszko
 Abel, Achacy, Achacjusz, Aspazja, Bazyli, Izydor, Jakobina, Jakubina, Makary, Narcyz, Ritka, Stefania, Strzeżysław, Sylwester, Sylwestra, Telesfor, Telesfora
 Danuta, Piotr, Genowefa
 Angelika, Aniela, Dobromir, Eugeniusz, Grzegorz, Izabela
 Edward, Emilian, Hania, Szymon
 Andrzej, Bolemir, Kacper, Kasper
 Julian, Lucjan, Walenty
 Mścisław, Seweryn
 Antoni, Borzymir, Julian, Julianna
 Dobrosław, Jan, Paweł
 Feliks, Krzesimir, Matylda
 Antoni, Arkadiusz, Benedykt, Czesław, Czesława, Ernest 
 Bogumił, Bogusława, Weronika
 Feliks (k., m.), Piotr (k.), Nina, Szczęsny, Domosław, Radogost
 Aleksander, Dąbrówka, Dobrawa, Domasław, Paweł
 Marcel, Włodzimierz, Kevin
 Antoni, Jan, Rościsław
 Bogumił, Jaropełk, Krystyna, Małgorzata, Piotr
 Andrzej, Bernard, Erwin, Henryk, Mariusz, Marta, Racimir, Sara
 Dobiegniew, Fabian, Sebastian
 Agnieszka, Jarosław, Jarosława, Marcela
 Anastazy, Dobromysł, Dorian, Marta, Wincenty
 Jan, Maria, 
 Felicja, Mirogniew, Rafaela, Rafał, Tymoteusz
 Miłosz, Miłowan, Miłowit, Paweł, Tatiana, Maleszka
 Paula, Paulina, Wanda
 Angelika, Ilona, Julian
 Agnieszka, Augustyn, Julian, Karol, Piotr, Radomir
 Hanna, Walerian, Zdzisław
 Feliks, Gerard, Maciej, Marcin, Martyna, Sebastian
 Euzebiusz, Jan, Piotr

February 
 Dobrochna, Iga, Ignacy, Paweł, Siemirad, Żegota
 Joanna, Korneliusz, Maria, Miłosława, Rory
 Błażej, Ashish, Oskar, Stefan, Telimena
 Andrzej, Gilbert, Jan, Joanna, Józef, Weronika, Witosława
 Aga, Agata, Jakb, Jan, Paweł, Piotr
 Antoni, Bogdan, Bohdan, Dorota, Ksenia, Szymon
 Alfons, Parteniusz, Partenia, Romeusz, Romuald, Rozalia, Ryszard, Sulisław
 Gniewomir, Jan, Paweł, Piotr, Sebastian
 Bernard, Eryk, Eryka
 Gabriel, Jacek, Elwira, Erica
 Lucjan, Maria, Olgierd, Świętomira
 Julian, Laurenty, Nora
 Grzegorz, Jordan, Katarzyna, Toligniew, Linda
 Dobiesława, Józef, Konrad, Krystyna, Lilian, Liliana, Mikołaj, Niemir, Niemira, Zenon, Cyryl
 Georgina, Jordan, Jowita, Józef, Klaudiusz
 Bernard, Dan, Danuta, Julianna
 Donata, Franciszek, Julian, Konstanty, Łukasz, Niegomir, Zbigniew, Zbyszko
 Albert, Alberta, Krystiana, Więcesława, Zuzanna
 Arnold, Henryk, Konrad 
 Leon, Ludmiła, Ludomiła
 Eleonora, Feliks, Teodor
 Marta, Małgorzata, Piotr, Wiktor
 Bądzimir, Damian, Piotr, Roma, Seweryn
 Bogurad, Bogusz, Boguta, Maciej, Piotr
 Bolebor, Cezary, Maciej, Małgorzata
 Aleksander, Bogumił, Cezariusz, Mirosław, Ewelina
 Aleksander, Anastazja, Gabriel, Gabriela, Sierosława
 Józef, Roman, Lech
 Dobronieg, Roman

March
 Albin, Antoni, Antonina, Amelia, Feliks, Herakles, Joanna, Józef, Piotr, Leo
 Franciszek, Helena, Henryk, Krzysztof, Michał, Paweł, Piotr, Radosław
 Hieronim, Maryna
 Adrian, Adriana, Arkadiusz, Eugeniusz, Kazimierz, Lucja
 Adrian, Adriana, Fryderyk, Jan, Oliwia, Wacław, Wacława
 Eugenia, Jordan, Klaudian, Róża, Wiktor, Wojsław
 Felicja, Paweł, Tomasz
 Beata, Jan, Julian, Miligost, Miłogost, Stefan
 Dominik, Franciszka, Katarzyna
 Aleksander, Borzysław, Cyprian
 Benedykt, Drogosława, Edwin, Konstantyn, Rozyna
 Bernard, Blizbor, Grzegorz, Józefina
 Bożena, Ernest, Kasjan, Krystyna, Marek
 Bożeciecha, Jakub, Leon, Matylda, Michał
 Gościmir, Klemens, Krzysztof, Ludwika
 Henryka, Herbert, Izabela
 Gertruda, Jan, Patryk, Zbigniew, Zbyszko
 Aleksander, Boguchwał, Cyryl, Edward
 Bogdan, Józef
 Aleksander, Aleksandra, Bogusław, Klaudia
 Benedykt, Lubomira, Mikołaj
 Bogusław, Katarzyna, Kazimierz, Paweł
 Feliks, Katarzyna, Piotr
 Gabriel, Marek, Szymon
 Ireneusz, Łucja, Lucja, Lutomysł, Maria, Wieńczysław
 Emanuel, Feliks, Manuela, Teodor
 Benedykt, Ernest, Jan, Lidia, Rupert
 Aniela, Antoni, Jan
 Cyryl
 Amelia, Aniela, Częstobor, Jan
 Beniamin, Dobromira, Kornelia

April
 Grażyna, Katarzyna, Teodora, Tolisław, Zbigniew, Zbyszko
 Franciszek, Sądomir, Władysław, Władysława
 Antoni, Cieszygor, Jakub, Ryszard
 Benedykt, Izydor, Wacław, Wacława
 Borzywoj, Irena, Wincenty, Jam
 Ada, Adam, Ireneusz, Katarzyna, Świętobor
 Donata, Przecław
 Cezary, Radosław, Sieciesława, 
 Dobrosława, Dymitr, Maja
 Antoni, Daniel, Henryk, Małgorzata, Michał
 Filip, Jaromir, Leon, Marek
 Andrzej, Iwan, Juliusz, Siemiodrog, Wiktor, Zenon
 Jan, Justyn, Małgorzata, Marcin, Przemysł, Przemysław
 Julianna, Justyn, Maria, Myślimir
 Anastazja, Leonid, Wacław, Wacława
 Erwin, Julia, Ksenia, Nikita, Nosisław
 Jakub, Józef, Klara, Radociech, Robert, Rudolf, Stefan
 Bogusław, Bogusława, Gościsław
 Cieszyrad, Czechasz, Czesław, Leon, Tymon, Werner, Włodzimierz
 Agnieszka, Czechoń, Czesław, Nawoj, Szymon, Teodor, Mario
 Bartosz, Drogomił, Feliks, Konrad
 Kajus, Kaja, Łukasz, Teodor
 Gerard, Helena, Jerzy, Wojciech
 Aleksander, Erwin, Grzegorz, Joanna
 Jarosław, Marek
 Maria, Marzena, Spycimir, ulku, cenk
 Andrzej, Bożebor, Martyn, Piotr, Zyta
 Maria, Paweł 
 Angelina, Augustyn, Bogusław, Piotr, Robert
 Bartłomiej, Jakub, Katarzyna, Marian, Yvie

May
 Aniela, Filip, Jakub, Józef, Lubomir, Maja, Zofia
 Walter, Witomir, Zygmunt, Wouter
 Aleksander, Antonina, Maria, Mariola, Świętosława
 Grzegorz, Michał, Monika,
 Irena, Teodor, Waldemar
 Gościwit, Jan, 
 Benedykt, Bogumir, Ludmiła, Ludomiła
 Marek, Michał, Piotr, Stanisław
 Bożydar, Grzegorz, Karolina, Mikołaj
 Częstomir, Jan
 Filip, Franciszek, Iga, Ignacy, Lew, Lutogniew, Mira, Żegota
 Dominik, Jan, Joanna, Wszemił, Pankracy
 Andrzej, Ciechosław, Gloria, Magdalena, Piotr, Robert
 Dobiesław, Wiktor, Maciej
 Jan, Zofia, Abhishek
 Andrzej, Jędrzej, Szymon, Wieńczysław
 Bruno, Sławomir, Weronika, Wiktor
 Aleksander, Aleksandra, Alicja, Edwin, Eryk, Eryka, Feliks, Irena, Myślibor
 Augustyn, Celestyn, Mikołaj, Pękosław, Piotr, Timur
 Bronimir, Teodor, Wiktoria
 Donata, Jan, Tymoteusz, Wiktor
 Emil, Helena, Jan, Julia, Ryta, Wiesław, Wiesława, Wisława
 Budziwoj, Emilia, Iwona, Jan, Michał
 Cieszysława, Jan, Joanna, Maria, Milena, Zula, Zuzanna
 Grzegorz, Imisława, Maria Magdalena
 Filip, Marianna, Paulina, Ewelina, Więcemił
 Jan, Juliusz, Lucjan, Magdalena, Radowit
 Augustyn, Jaromir, Wiktor, Wrocimir
 Bogusława, Maksymilian, Maria, Magdalena, Teodor, Urszula
 Feliks, Joanna
 Aniela, Bożysława, Teodor

June
 Bernard, Jakub, Konrad, Magdalena, Nikodem, Symeon, Świętopełk, 
 Eugeniusz, Maria, Marianna, Mariana, Mikołaj, Piotr, Racisław, 
 Konstantyn, Leszek, Paula, Tamara, Oliwia
 Franciszek, Gościmił, Karol, 
 Dobrociech, Dobromir, Dobrymir, 
 Dominika Rak, Norbert, Paulina, Więcerad, 
 Antoni, Ciechomir, Jarosław, Paweł, Robert, Wiesław, Wisław, 
 Maksym, Seweryn, Wyszesław, 
 Felicjan, 
 Bogumił, Edgar, Małgorzata, 
 Feliks, Radomił, 
 Antonina, Jan, Leon, Wyszemir, 
 Antoni, Chociemir, Lucjan, Maria Magdalena, Tobiasz, 
 Eliza, Justyn, Justyna, Ninogniew, 
 Angelina, Jolanta, Witold, Witołd, Witolda, Witosław, 
 Alina, Aneta, Budzimir, Jan, Justyna, 
 Agnieszka, Drogomysł, Franciszek, Laura, Marcjan, Radomił, 
 Elżbieta, Marek, Marina, Paula, 
 Julianna, 
 Bogna, Bogumiła, Bożena, Franciszek, Michał, Rafaela, Rafał, 
 Alicja, Domamir, Marta, Teodor, 
 Broniwoj, Paulina, 
 Józef, Piotr, Wanda, Zenon, 
 Dan, Danisz, Danuta, Emilia, Jan, 
 Lucja, Łucja, Tolisława
 Jan, Paweł
 Maria Magdalena, Władysław, Władysława, 
 Ireneusz, Józef, Leon, Paweł, 
 Dalebor, Paweł, Piotr, 
 Ciechosława, Emilia, Lucyna, Kaitlyn

July
 Halina,  Marian, Hanya
 Maria, Piotr. Jagoda
 Jacek, Leon, Miłosław
 Elżbieta, Józef, Julian, Teodor, Wielisław
 Antoni, Bartłomiej, Jakub, Karolina, Michał
 Chociebor, Dominik, Dominika, Łucja, Lucja, Niegosław
 Antoni, Kira, Piotr, Benedykt, Cyryl, Lucjan
 Adrian, Adrianna, Chwalimir, Edgar, Elżbieta, Eugeniusz
 Łucja, Lucja, Mikołaj, Weronika, Zenon, Lauren, Sylwia 
 Aleksander, Amelia, Aniela, Filip
 Cyprian, Kalina, Olga 
 Andrzej, Euzebiusz, Feliks, Henryk, Paweł, Piotr, Tolimir, Weronika
 Ernest, Eugeniusz, Jakub, Justyna, Małgorzata, Radomiła, Sara
 Damian, Dobrogost, Franciszek, Izabela, Marcelina
 Daniel, Dawid, Henryk, Iga, Ignacy, Lubomysł, Niecisław, Włodzimierz, Żegota
 Andrzej, Maria Magdalena, Marika, Stefan, James
 Aleksander, Renger, Andrzej, Bogdan, Marcelina, Maria Magdalena, Aneta
 Erwin, Kamil, Karolina, Robert, Szymon, Unisław
 Lutobor, Wincenty
 Czechoń, Czesław, Małgorzata, Paweł
 Andrzej, Daniel, Paulina, Stojsław, Wiktor
 Bolesława, Bolisława, Maria Magdalena, Milenia, Więcemiła
 Bogna, Żelisław
 Antoni, Kinga, Krystyna, Olga, Wojciecha
 Jakub, Krzysztof, Sławosz, Walentyna
 Anna, Baldev, Grażyna, Mirosława
 Julia, Marta, Natalia, Wszebor
 Marcela, Świętomir, Wiktor
 Konstantyn, Maria, Marta, Olaf
 Julia, Julita, Ludmiła, Maryna
 Emilian, Helena, Iga, Ignacy, Ludomir

August
 Konrad, Piotr
 Borzysława, Karina, Maria, Stefan
 Augusta, Lidia, Nikodem, Szczepan
 Dominik, Maria, Mironieg, nadia
 Emil, Maria, Stanisława
 Jakub, Sława, Stefan, Wincenty
 Anna, Dobiemir, Donata, Dorota, Kajetan
 Cyprian, Cyryl, Emil, Emilian, Emiliusz
 Jan, Klarysa, Miłorad, Roman
 Bogdan, Borys
 Aleksander, Włodzimierz, Włodziwoj, Zula, Zuzanna
 Klara, Lech, Piotr,Tara 
 Diana, Helena, Jan, Kasjan, Radomiła, Wojbor
 Dobrowoj, Euzebiusz
 Maria, Stefan
 Domarad, Domarat, Joachim
 Anastazja, Angelika, Anita, Eliza, Jacek, Jaczewoj, Joanna, Julianna, Miron, Żanna
 Bogusława, Bronisław, Bradley, Bronisz, Helena, Ilona, Klara
 Bolesław, Emilia, Jan, Julian, Juliusz, Piotr
 Jan, Samuel, Samuela, Sieciech, Sobiesław, Świeciech
 Emilian, Filipina, Franciszek, Joanna, Kazimiera, Męcimir
 Cezary, Dalegor, Maria, Namysław, Tymoteusz, Zygfryd
 Filip, Laurenty
 Bartłomiej, Cieszymir, Jerzy, Joanna, Malina, Michalina, Albert
 Grzegorz, Luiza, Michał, Sieciesław
 Dobroniega, Joanna, Konstanty, Maksym, Maria
 Cezary, Józef, Monika, Małgorzata, Teodor
 Adelina, Aleksander, Aleksy, Augustyn, Patrycja, Sobiesław, Stronisław
 Gita, Jan, Racibor, Sabina
 Częstowoj, Miron, Rebeka, Róża, Szczęsna, Szczęsny
 Bohdan, Paulina, Rajmund, Świętosław

September
 Bronisław, Bronisława, Bronisz
 Bohdan, Czesław, Eliza, Henryk, Julian, Stefan, Tobiasz, Witomysł
 Antoni, Bartłomiej, Bronisław, Bronisz, Izabela, Jan, Joachim, Mojmir, Szymon, Wincenty, Zenon
 Ida, Lilianna, Rościgniew, Róża, Rozalia
 Dorota, Justyna, Stronisława, Wawrzyniec
 Albin, Beata, Eugenia, Eugeniusz, Michał, Uniewit
 Domasława, Domisława, Marek, Regina, Rena, Ryszard
 Adrian, Adrianna, Maria, Radosław, Radosława, Klementyna
 Augustyna, Aureliusz, Piotr, Ścibor, Ścibora, Sergiusz, Sobiesąd
 Aldona, Łukasz, Mikołaj, Mścibor
 Feliks, Jacek, Jan, Naczesław
 Amadeusz, Maria, Piotr, Sylwin
 Aleksander, Eugenia, Filip, Lubor, Morzysław, Szeliga
 Bernard, Cyprian, Roksana, Siemomysł, Szymon
 Maria, Nikodem
 Cyprian, Edyta, Eugenia, Franciszek, Kamila, Kornel, Lucja, Łucja, Wiktor
 Drogosław, Franciszek, Justyn, Justyna, Teodora
 Dobrowit, Irena, Józef, Stefania
 Konstancja, Teodor, Więcemir
 Agnieszka, Barbara, Dionizy, Eustachiusz, Eustachy, Fausta, Faustyna, Filipina, Irena, Klemens, Mieczysława, Miłowuj, Oleg, Perpetua, Protazy
 Bożeciech, Bożydar, Jonasz, Laurenty, Mateusz, Mira
 Joachim, Maurycy, Prosimir, Scott, Tomasz
 Boguchwała, Bogusław, Elżbieta, Krzysztof, Libert, Litoriusz, Liwiusz, Piotr, Tekla, Zachariusz
 Gerard, Maria, Teodor, Tomir, Uniegost
 Aurelia, Franciszek, Kamil, Ładysław, Piotr, Świętopełk, Wincenty, Władysław, Władysława
 Cyprian, Euzebiusz, Justyna, Łękomir
 Amadeusz, Damian
 Jan, Luba, Lubosza, Marek, Nikita, Sylwin, Wacław, Wacława, Więcesław
 Michał, Rafał, Gabriel
 Grzegorz, Hieronim, Honoriusz, Imisław, Rachela, Wera, Wiera, Wiktor, Zofia

October
 Danuta, Remigiusz, Cieszysław, Dan, Danisz, Igor, Jan, Remigiusz
 Stanimir, Teofil
 Gerard, Józefa, Sierosław, Teresa
 Edwin, Franciszek, Konrad, Rozalia
 Częstogniew, Donata, Igor, Justyn, Konstancjusz, 
 Artur, Bronisław, Bronisz, Emil, Roman
 Justyna, Marek, Maria, Rościsława, Stefan, Mirella
 Bryda, Brygida, Laurencja, Marcin, Wojsława
 Bogdan, Jan, Ludwik, Sara
 Franciszek, Lutomir, Paulina, Tomił
 Aldona, Dobromiła, Emil, Emilian, Emiliusz, Maria, Marian
 Maksymilian, Witold
 Daniel, Edward, Mikołaj, Siemisław
 Alan, Bernard, Dominik
 Jadwiga, Teresa
 Aurelia, Gerard, Grzegorz
 Lucyna, Małgorzata, Marian, Wiktor
 Julian, Łukasz
 Ferdynand, Piotr, Siemowit, Skarbimir, Ziemowit, Oliwia
 Irena, 
 Bernard, Celina, Dobromił, Elżbieta, Urszula 
 Filip, Halka
 Iga, Ignacy, Jan, Marlena, Roman, Seweryn, Teodor, Włościsław, Żegota
 Antoni, Boleczest, Filip, Marcin, Rafaela, Rafał, Soyazhe
 Daria, Kryspin, Sambor, Taras
 Dymitriusz, Łucjan, Lucyna, Ludmiła, Lutosław
 Iwona, Sabina, Wincenty
 Szymon, Tadeusz, Wszeciech
 Euzebia, Franciszek, Lubogost, Teodor, Wioletta
 Edmund, Klaudiusz, Przemysław, Sądosław
 Antoni, Antonina, Godzimir, Lucylla, Łukasz, Dezemir

November
 Andrzej, Seweryn, Warcisław, Wiktoryna 
 Bohdana, Bożydar, Małgorzata, Stojmir, Tobiasz
 Bogumił, Cezary, Chwalisław, Hubert, Sylwia
 Mściwój, Olgierd, Karol
  Elżbieta, Florian, Jakub
 Feliks, Leonard, Trzebowit, Ziemowit
 Antoni, Florentyn, Przemił
 Dymitr, Klaudiusz, Seweryn, Wiktor
 Bogudar, Genowefa, Teodor, Ursyn
 Andrzej, Lena, Leon, Ludomir, Stefan
 Anastazja, Bartłomiej, Maciej, Marcin, Spycisław, Teodor
 Cibor, Czcibor, Jonasz, Krystyn, Marcin, Renata, Witold
 Arkadiusz, Eugeniusz, Jan, Mikołaj, Stanisław
 Aga, Damian, Elżbieta, Emil, Emiliusz, Józef, Judyta, Ścibor, Ścibora, Wszerad
  Alfons, Artur, Gurias, Idalia, Józef, Leopold, Leopoldyna, Przybygniew, Roger
 Edmund, Marek, Maria, Niedamir, Otomar, Paweł, Piotr
 Grzegorz
 Agnieszka, Aniela, Cieszymysł, Klaudyna, Roman, Tomasz
 Elżbieta, Mironiega, Paweł, Seweryn
 Edmund, Feliks, Gareth, Sędzimir
 Janusz, Konrad, Maria, Piotr, Regina, Rena, Twardosław, Wiesław
 Cecylia, Marek, Wszemiła
 Adela, Klemens, Przedwoj
 Dobrosław, Emilia, Emma, Franciszek, Gerard, Jan, Pęcisław
 Katarzyna, Tęgomir, 
 Dobiemiest, Jan, Konrad, Lechosław, Lechosława, Leonard, Sylwester
 Dominik, Maksymilian, Stojgniew, Walery
 Gościrad, Grzegorz, Jakub, Lesław, Lesława, Zdzisław
 Błażej, Bolemysł, Fryderyk, Przemysł
 Andrzej, Justyna, Konstanty

December
 Blanka, Długosz, Edmund, Iwa, Natalia, Sobiesława, 
 Aurelia, Balbina, Bibiana,  Budzisław, Budzisława, Ludwina, Paulina, Sulisław, Sylweriusz, Sylwery, Wiktoryn, Zbylut, 
 Franciszek, Kasjan, Lucjusz, Unimir, 
 Barbara, Hieronim, Krystian, Piotr, 
 Gerald, Krystyna, Pęcisława, 
 Emilian, Jarogniew, Mikołaj, Nicole, 
 Marcin, Ninomysł, 
 Boguwola, Maria, Światozar, 
 Joachim, Wielisława, Wiesław, 
 Andrzej, Daniel, Judyta, Julia, Maria, 
 Daniela, Julia, Stefan, Waldemar, Wojmir, 
 Aleksander, Dagmara, 
 Lucja, Łucja, Otylia, 
 Alfred, Izydor, Sławobor, 
 Celina, Iga, Ignacy, Krystiana, Nina, Wolimir, Żegota, 
 Alina, Zdzisława, 
 Florian, Jolanta, Żyrosław, 
 Bogusław, Gracjan, Laurencja, Wszemir, Samantha
 Beniamin, Dariusz, Gabriela, Mścigniew, Tymoteusz, 
 Bogumiła, Dominik, 
 Tomasz, Tomisław, 
 Beata, Drogomir, Franciszka, Zenon, 
 Sławomir, Sławomira, Wiktoria, 
 Adam, Adamina, Adela, Ewa, Ewelina, Grzegorz, 
 Anastazja, Eugenia, Piotr, 
 Szczepan, Wróciwoj, Sylwia, Anna, Marie, Magdalena, 
 Cezary, Jan, Radomysł, 
 Antoni, Dobrowiest, Emma, 
 Dawid, Domawit, Dominik, Gosław, Jonatan, Marcin, Tomasz, 
 Dawid, Eugeniusz, Katarzyna, Uniedrog, milenka, 
 Korneliusz, Melania, Sebastian, Sylwester,

See also
 Name day
 Polish name
 Polish phonology

External links
 Imieniny Polska 
 Polish name days
 Name days in Poland
 http://www.imiennik.pl/index.php?ids=1 Name days 

Poland
Festivals in Poland
Polish traditions
Polish given names
Polish names
Polish culture
Saints days